The Perdana-class is a class of fast attack craft in service with the Royal Malaysian Navy. This class is based on the  design built by CMN Lurssen. A total of four ships completed and currently in service with Royal Malaysian Navy.

Development

They have a displacement of 265 tons full load and the complement of 30. The armament consists of one Bofors 57 mm gun as the main gun and one Bofors 40 mm gun as the secondary gun. For anti-surface warfare they are armed with four Exocet MM38 missiles. She also completed with the sensors and processing systems, electronic warfare and decoys. In late 2020 the Royal Malaysian Navy confirmed that this class of ship will be upgraded to lengthen the service period of older ships.

Ships of the class

References

Missile boat classes
Naval ships of Malaysia